Banque Capitale du Bénin (BCB), formerly Banque d'etat du Benin, is a medium-sized commercial bank providing e-banking and other services in Benin. It is a member of the West African Bankers' Association.

It has its headquarters at Carrefour des 3 Banques in Porto-Novo but also has branches in Cotonou and Parakou.

Banque Capitale du Bénin (BCB) began as a private limited liability company on March 21, 1991 (the company was incorporated on December 20, 1990). Ten years later, in February 2001, it became a universal bank.

Banks of Benin